Single Princesses and Blind Dates is a 2010 Mainland China romance and comedy serial drama starring Taiwanese actor singer Jimmy Lin as the male lead, Chinese actress Zhao Liang as the female lead with Taiwanese actor, singer, model Dylan Kuo as the second male lead. It is adapted from a popular novel of the same name. Filming began on April 1, 2010 in Shanghai, China and ended in June 2010. The series began broadcasting on Chinese channel Hunan TV from September 17, 2010 on Sunday and Saturday's at 10:30 to 11:30 with 2 episodes airing per day, ending on October 2, 2010 with 30 episodes total. The series with English subtitles can also be seen on web channel Hulu.com .

Synopsis
Le Tong Tong (Zhao Liang) had her dream wedding all planned, she invited all her relatives and friends but nearing the day of their wedding day her fiancé  dumps her for her rival co-worker. To make matters worse the incident was caught on a surveillance camera for all to witness her embarrassment. She soon has further heartbreak when her former fiancé  marries his new girlfriend right away. Not wanting to lose face or feel defeated to her former fiancé and love rival she and her friends set our to find her a new husband to be on a series of blind dates.

Cast

Main cast
Jimmy Lin 林志颖 as Ji Fan 纪凡
Zhao Liang 赵子靓 as Le Tong Tong 乐彤彤
Dylan Kuo 郭品超 as Fang Yan 饰方

Supporting cast
Hong Xiao Ling 洪小玲 as Kelly 凯莉
Zheng Kai 郑恺 as Li Xiao Yao 李逍遥
Chen Yan Fei 陈彦妃 as Ba Mei 八妹
Lei Jia Yin 雷佳音 as Chang Sheng 常盛

Soundtrack
You Are The One by Jimmy Lin 林志颖
Color 颜色 by Jimmy Lin 林志颖
Orange Balloon 橘色气球 by Vivi Jiang 江映蓉
Clone 复制人 by Vivi Jiang 江映蓉
I Do Not know 我不知道 by Sugar Tang 唐笑
September 九月 by Sugar Tang 唐笑

Production Team
Producers:
Ouyang Chang Lin 欧阳常林
James Yao 姚嘉
Zhou Lin 周琳
Supervising Producers:
Cheng Boji 盛伯骥 
Zhu Deqiang 朱德强 
Zhang Yong 张勇    
 Director: 
Chen Ming Zhang 陈铭章
 Screenwriter: 
Gu Yi 顾奕

References

External links
Baidu.com
Baidu.com
Baidu.com video
Facebook page

2010 Chinese television series debuts
2010 Chinese television series endings
Chinese romantic comedy television series
Television shows set in China
Hunan Television dramas